The J. Paul Getty Award for Conservation Leadership has been awarded annually since 2006 in recognition of outstanding leadership in global conservation. The award aims to acknowledge individuals making "pioneering and substantial" contributions to conservation as well as foster the development of future leaders in conservation. The $200,000 cash award goes to fund graduate fellowships for students in conservation-related fields. These fellowships are established at the institution of higher learning of the awardee's choice and named in honor of the award recipient and J. Paul Getty.

Currently, the award is administered by the World Wildlife Fund on behalf of the Getty family. Conservation organizations worldwide submit nominations to the WWF and winners are selected by an impartial panel of judges from the conservation community. The Getty Award recognizes achievement in three annually rotating categories: political leadership in conservation (2006), leadership in conservation science (2007), and community leadership in conservation (2008). The 2009 Getty Award will mark begin the second rotation by again recognizing outstanding achievement in political conservation leadership.

History

The prize was first instituted by philanthropist and businessman J. Paul Getty in 1974 as the J. Paul Getty Wildlife Conservation Prize. Initially, the prize had the broad aim to recognize "outstanding contributions to international conservation" but was renamed in 2004 to reflect a restructuring of the award to "give it greater focus and strengthen its impact on conservation."[1] The newly established J. Paul Getty Award for Conservation Leadership was awarded for the first time in 2006.

In 1983 the Wildlife Conservation Prize was presented to the awardees by President Ronald Reagan at a ceremony in the White House Rose Garden. According to Russell E. Train, the president of the World Wildlife Fund in the United States at the time, Reagan referred to the Getty Award as the "Nobel Prize for conservation."

Recipients

J. Paul Getty Award for Conservation Leadership recipients (2008-2006)[1]

J. Paul Getty Wildlife Conservation Prize recipients (2003-1974)

Brief Awardee Biographies
Salim Ali (1975)
Salim Ali, referred to as the "Birdman of India", became the first Indian to conduct systematic bird surveys across India and wrote several bird books that popularized ornithology in India.
Dr. K. Ullas Karanth (2007)
Dr. Karanth has done pioneering work on tiger and other carnivore conservation across India, particularly in the Nagarhole wildlife sanctuary. He is also seen as the motivating spirit behind the creation of three protected areas in the Western Ghats forest of Southeastern India. The money will go towards funding graduate research at the National Center for Biological Sciences in Bangalore.

See also

 List of environmental awards

References

Environmental awards
Awards established in 1974